Chamkaur Sahib is a Sub Divisional town in the district of Rupnagar in the Indian State of Punjab. It is famous for the First Battle of Chamkaur (1702) and the Second Battle of Chamkaur (1704) fought between the Mughals and Guru Gobind Singh.

Situated on the banks of the Sirhind Canal, Chamkaur sahib is at a distance of 15 km from Morinda and 16 km from Rupnagar. Guru Gobind Singh and his two elder sons and 40 followers had come to this place from Kotla Nihang Khan with his Mughal pursuers close on his heels. They came in the garden said to be of Raja roop chand, where now Gurudwara Katlgarh Sahib stands. There are several other Gurudwaras named Tari Sahib, Damdama Sahib, Garhi Sahib & Ranjitgarh Sahib that mark the visits and halts of Guru Gobind Singh.

Five Historical Gurdwaras in Chamkaur Sahib
Gurdwara Sri Katalgarh Sahib.
Gurdwara Sri Garhi Sahib.
Gurdwara Sri Damdama Sahib.
Gurdwara Sri Ranjitgarh Sahib.
Gurdwara Sri Tarri Sahib.

Theme Park at Shri Chamkaur Sahib commemorating life and sacrifices of Guru Gobind Singh's eldest sons Baba Ajit Singh and Baba Jujhar Singh has been recently completed.

The Annual ceremony of Elder Sahibzada's of Sri Guru Gobind Singh ji  Baba Ajit Singh ji, Baba Jujhar Singh ji, Three Piara Bhai Himat Singh ji, Bhai Mohkam Singh ji, Bhai Sahib Singh ji and 40 brave Sikh Soldiers has been celebrated every year with due respect in 20–22 December (6,7,8 Poh).

Gallery

References

Cities and towns in Rupnagar district